The 32nd Virginia Cavalry Battalion was a cavalry battalion which served in the Confederate States Army during the American Civil War. It was formed in November 1862 with two companies and served in the Department of Richmond. In September 1863 it was merged with the 40th Virginia Cavalry Battalion to form the 42nd Virginia Cavalry Battalion.

See also
List of Virginia Civil War units

Sources
 32nd Virginia Cavalry Battalion

Units and formations of the Confederate States Army from Virginia
1862 establishments in Virginia
Military units and formations established in 1862
1865 disestablishments in Virginia
Military units and formations disestablished in 1865